Colin Keith Kemball (1928–2004), was a male athlete who competed for England.

Athletics career
He represented England in the marathon at the 1958 British Empire and Commonwealth Games in Cardiff, Wales.

References

1928 births
2004 deaths
English male marathon runners
Athletes (track and field) at the 1958 British Empire and Commonwealth Games
Commonwealth Games competitors for England